The 2020 All-Big Ten Conference football team consists of American football players chosen as All-Big Ten Conference players for the 2020 Big Ten Conference football season.  The conference recognizes two official All-Big Ten selectors: (1) the Big Ten conference coaches selected separate offensive and defensive units and named first-, second- and third-team players (the "Coaches" team); and (2) a panel of sports writers and broadcasters covering the Big Ten also selected offensive and defensive units and named first-, second- and third-team players (the "Media" team).

Offensive selections

Quarterbacks
 Justin Fields, Ohio State (Coaches-1; Media-1)
 Michael Penix Jr., Indiana (Coaches-2; Media-2)
 Peyton Ramsey, Northwestern (Coaches-3; Media-3)

Running backs
 Mohamed Ibrahim, Minnesota (Coaches-1; Media-1)
 Tyler Goodson, Iowa (Coaches-1; Media-1)
 Stevie Scott III, Indiana (Coaches-2; Media-2)
 Trey Sermon, Ohio State (Coaches-2; Media-2)
 Zander Horvath, Purdue (Coaches-3; Media-3)
 Jake Funk, Maryland (Coaches-3)
Chase Brown, Illinois (Media-3)

Wide receivers
 David Bell, Purdue (Coaches-2; Media-1)
 Ty Fryfogle, Indiana (Coaches-2; Media-1)
 Chris Olave, Ohio State (Coaches-1; Media-2)
 Garrett Wilson, Ohio State (Coaches-1; Media-2)
 Rashod Bateman, Minnesota (Coaches-3; Media-3)
 Jahan Dotson, Penn State (Coaches-3; Media-3)

Centers
 Josh Myers, Ohio State (Coaches-1; Media-2)
 Tyler Linderbaum, Iowa (Coaches-2; Media-1)
 Michal Menet, Penn State (Coaches-3; Media-3)

Guards
 Wyatt Davis, Ohio State (Coaches-1; Media-1)
 Kendrick Green, Illinois (Coaches-1; Media-1)
 Cole Banwart, Iowa (Coaches-2; Media-2)
 Mike Miranda, Penn State (Coaches-2; Media-2)
 Logan Bruss, Wisconsin (Coaches-3; Media-3)
 Harry Miller, Ohio State (Coaches-3)
 Conner Olson, Minnesota (Media-3)

Tackles
 Alaric Jackson, Iowa (Coaches-1; Media-1)
 Thayer Munford, Ohio State (Coaches-1; Media-1)
 Cole Van Lanen, Wisconsin (Coaches-1; Media-2)
 Will Fries, Penn State (Coaches-2)
 Nicholas Petit-Frere, Ohio State (Coaches-2)
 Peter Skoronski, Northwestern (Coaches-3; Media-2)
 Blaise Andries, Minnesota (Media-3)
 Rasheed Walker, Penn State (Media-3)

Tight ends
 Pat Freiermuth, Penn State (Coaches-1; Media-2)
 Jake Ferguson, Wisconsin (Coaches-2; Media-1)
 Peyton Hendershot, Indiana (Coaches-3; Media-3)

Defensive selections

Defensive linemen
 Chauncey Golston, Iowa (Coaches-1; Media-1)
 Daviyon Nixon, Iowa (Coaches-1; Media-1)
 Shaka Toney, Penn State (Coaches-1; Media-1)
 Jerome Johnson, Indiana (Coaches-2; Media-1)
 Odafe Oweh, Penn State (Coaches-1; Media-2)
 Owen Carney, Illinois (Coaches-2; Media-2)
 Tommy Togiai, Ohio State (Coaches-2; Media-2)
 Zach VanValkenburg, Iowa (Coaches-2; Media-2)
 Jonathon Cooper, Ohio State (Coaches-3; Media-3)
 Zach Harrison, Ohio State (Coaches-2)
 Haskell Garrett, Ohio State (Coaches-3)
 George Karlaftis, Purdue (Coaches-2)
 Eku Leota, Northwestern (Media-3)
 Isaiahh Loudermilk, Wisconsin (Media-3)
 Kwity Paye, Michigan (Media-2)

Linebackers
 Paddy Fisher, Northwestern (Coaches-1; Media-1)
 Micah McFadden, Indiana (Coaches-1; Media-1)
 Olakunle Fatukasi, Rutgers (Coaches-2; Media-1)
 Pete Werner, Ohio State (Coaches-1; Media-3)
 Derrick Barnes, Purdue (Coaches-2; Media-3)
 Baron Browning, Ohio State (Coaches-3)
 Blake Gallagher, Northwestern (Coaches-2; Media-2)
 Jake Hansen, Illinois (Coaches-3; Media-2)
 Nick Niemann, Iowa (Coaches-3)
 Jack Sanborn, Wisconsin (Media-3)
 Antjuan Simmons, Michigan State (Coaches-3; Media-2)

Defensive backs
 Brandon Joseph, Northwestern (Coaches-1; Media-1)
 Greg Newsome II, Northwestern (Coaches-1; Media-1)
 Shaun Wade, Ohio State (Coaches-1; Media-1)
 Shakur Brown, Michigan State (Coaches-1; Media-2)
 Jamar Johnson, Indiana (Coaches-2; Media-1)
 Tiawan Mullen, Indiana (Coaches-2; Media-1)
 Tre Avery, Rutgers (Coaches-3; Media-3)
 Jaquan Brisker, Penn State (Coaches-3)
 Jack Koerner, Iowa (Coaches-3; Media-2)
 Devon Matthews, Indiana (Coaches-3; Media-3)
 Joey Porter Jr., Penn State (Media-3)
 Cam Taylor-Britt, Nebraska (Coaches-2)
 Lamont Wade, Penn State (Media-3)
 Caesar Williams, Wisconsin (Coaches-3)
 Jaylin Williams, Indiana (Coaches-2; Media-2)

Special teams

Kickers
 Connor Culp, Nebraska (Coaches-1; Media-1)
 Charles Campbell, Indiana (Coaches-2; Media-2)
 Keith Duncan, Iowa (Coaches-3; Media-3)

Punters
 Tory Taylor, Iowa (Coaches-1; Media-1)
 Adam Korsak, Rutgers (Coaches-3; Media-2)
 Drue Chrisman, Ohio State (Coaches-2)
 Blake Hayes, Illinois (Media-3)

Return specialist
 Aron Cruickshank, Rutgers (Coaches-1; Media-1)
 Giles Jackson, Michigan (Coaches-3; Media-2)
 Charlie Jones, Iowa (Coaches-2; Media-3)

Key

See also
 2020 College Football All-America Team

References

All-Big Ten Conference
All-Big Ten Conference football teams